Rahmad bin Mariman is a Malaysian politician who has served as Member of the Melaka State Executive Council (EXCO) in the Barisan Nasional (BN) state administration under Chief Minister Sulaiman Md Ali since March 2020 and Member of the Melaka State Legislative Assembly (MLA) for Ayer Molek since May 2018. He is a member of the United Malays National Organisation (UMNO), a component party of the ruling BN coalition.

Election results

Honours
  :
  Companion Class I of the Exalted Order of Malacca (DMSM) – Datuk (2020)

References 

Living people
People from Malacca
Malaysian people of Malay descent
Malaysian Muslims
United Malays National Organisation politicians
21st-century Malaysian politicians
Members of the Malacca State Legislative Assembly
Malacca state executive councillors
1964 births